Baha parab or Baa parab is a spring festival of Ho, Santhal,Munda and other tribes in India. "Baha" or "Baa" means flower. At Baha parab or Baa parab men, women and children are attired in traditional clothes, Offering Flowers to God Marang Buru and Jaher Ayo, and Madal tamak(drums) are beat and tribal woman and man dancing.

Ritual
Marking the festival, the naikey or deurey (the priest) performs a ritual. A kula with flowers and leaves of the sal tree is offered to a Jaherthan (the altar) and devotees pray to "Jaher Ara", the god. After performing the rituals, the naikey along with others goes from door to door with the kula to bless everyone.
People in the household, in particular young girls or women, offer food to the naikey. The naikey's feet are washed with water as he is welcomed by a
family. After performing the rituals, the second part of programme start with dances, songs and archery practice.

References

Further reading

External links

Festivals in India